This is an incomplete list of World Champions in Judo.



A 

Hifumi Abe
Uta Abe
Yago Abuladze
Clarisse Agbegnenou
Mayra Aguiar
Yuri Alvear
Takamasa Anai
An Baul
An Chang-rim
Chizuru Arai
Sarah Asahina

B 

Larbi Benboudaoud
Ingrid Berghmans
Daria Bilodid
Ákos Braun

C 

Tiago Camilo
Matthias Casse
Margaret Castro
Cho Gu-ham
Lukhumi Chkhvimiani
Choi Min-ho
Luciano Corrêa

D 

Christa Deguchi
Frédéric Demontfaucon
Ganbatyn Boldbaatar
João Derly
Brigitte Deydier
Sumiya Dorjsuren
David Douillet

E 

Masashi Ebinuma
Guillaume Elmont
Gévrise Émane
Noël van 't End

F 

Craig Fallon
Jorge Fonseca
Shōzō Fujii

G 

Marie-Ève Gahié
Anton Geesink
Dennis van der Geest
Yarden Gerbi
Asley Gonzalez
Gwak Dong-han

H 

Ryunosuke Haga
Shori Hamada
Soichi Hashimoto
Ruben Houkes

I 

Ilias Iliadis
Isao Inokuma
Kōsei Inoue
Hiroshi Izumi

J 
 Jeon Ki-young

K 

Kokoro Kageura
Daiki Kamikawa
Majlinda Kelmendi
Kim Jae-bum
Kim Min-soo
Jessica Klimkait
Toshihiko Koga
Ami Kondo
Sergei Kosorotov
Antal Kovács
Lukáš Krpálek
Rafał Kubacki
Radomir Kovacevic

L 

Lee Kyu-won
Lee Won-hee
Mariusz Linke
Anis Lounifi

M 

Nemanja Majdov
Vitaliy Makarov
Madeleine Malonga
Elkhan Mammadov
Joshiro Maruyama
Barbara Matić
Kaori Matsumoto
Alexander Mikhaylin
Arash Miresmaeili
Saeid Mollaei
Yasuyuki Muneta
Sagi Muki

N 

Takanori Nagase
Misato Nakamura
Riki Nakaya
Paweł Nastula
Tadahiro Nomura

O 

Liliko Ogasawara
Naoya Ogawa
Shohei Ono
Idalys Ortiz

P 

Paula Pareto
Jimmy Pedro
Loïc Pietri

Q 

Udo Quellmalz

R 

Thierry Rey
Teddy Riner
Wim Ruska

S 

Hitoshi Saito
Peter Seisenbacher
Lasha Shavdatuashvili
Nikoloz Sherazadishvili
Shinichi Shinohara
Ai Shishime
Yeldos Smetov
Rishod Sobirov
Akira Sone
Anita Staps
Keiji Suzuki

T 

Naohisa Takato
Avtandil Tchrikishvili
Funa Tonaki
Stéphane Traineau 
Tina Trstenjak 
Khashbaataryn Tsagaanbaatar
Irakli Tsirekidze
Natsumi Tsunoda
Guram Tushishvili

U 

Nae Udaka
Mami Umeki

V 

Marhinde Verkerk

W 

Anna-Maria Wagner
Wang Ki-chun
Florian Wanner
Alexander Wieczerzak
Aaron Wolf

Y 

Yasuhiro Yamashita
Hidehiko Yoshida
Tsukasa Yoshida
Yu Song

World Judo Championships
World
Judo